Cagpating is an island located in the Philippine island Province of Masbate.

See also

 List of islands of the Philippines

References

External links
 Image of Cagpating island. Ph.geoview.info

Islands of Masbate